Banas may refer to:

Toponyms
 Banas River, a tributary of the Chambal River in Rajasthan, India
 West Banas River, a river in western India rising in Rajasthan and flowing south through the plains of Gujarat state into the Little Rann of Kutch
 Ras Banas, a peninsula in Egypt extending into the Red Sea
 Qarah Benas, also transliterated as Qareh Banās, a village in Khezel-e Gharbi Rural District, Kermanshah Province, Iran

People
 Arlene Banas (born 1946), voice actress
 Carl Banas (born 1929), Canadian radio personality and actor
 Jozef Banáš (born 1948), Slovak novelist, journalist, diplomat and politician
 Ludovico Arroyo Bañas (1901–1979), official of the Philippine Bureau of Telecommunications
 Michala Banas (born 1978), New Zealand television actress and singer
 Robert Banas (born 1933), American dancer and actor
 Steve Banas (1907–1974), American football player

See also
 Ahar–Banas culture, also known as the Banas culture, a Chalcolithic archaeological culture in India from 3000 to 1500 BCE
 Banas Dairy, a dairy based in Banaskantha district of Gujarat, India
 Bana Kingdom, a dynasty of South India, also known as the Banas
 Banas Medical College and Research Institute, Palanpur, Gujarat, India
 Banaś, a Polish surname
 Bana (disambiguation)